Zanotti is an Italian surname. Notable people with the surname include:

 Eustachio Zanotti (1709-1782), Italian astronomer and engineer
 Fabrizio Zanotti (born 1983), Paraguayan professional golfer
 Fio Zanotti (born 1949), Italian record producer, arranger, conductor, composer and multiinstrumentalist
 Francesco Maria Zanotti (1692-1777), Italian philosopher and writer
 Gabriela Maria Zanotti Demoner (born 1983), Brazilian football player for Corinthians
 Giampietro Zanotti (1674-1765), Italian painter and art historian of the late-Baroque or Rococo period
 Giuseppe Zanotti (born 1957), Italian luxury footwear and fashion designer
 Guerrino Zanotti (born 1964), in 2014 Captain Regent of San Marino with Gianfranco Terenzi 
 Juri Zanotti (born 1999), Italian cross-country mountain biker
 Luca Zanotti (born 1994), Italian football player
 Marco Zanotti (cyclist, born 1974), road bicycle racer from Italy
 Marco Zanotti (cyclist, born 1988), Italian cyclist
 Mark Zanotti (born 1964), former Australian rules footballer
 Mattia Zanotti (born 2003), Italian professional footballer
 Simone Zanotti (born 1992), Italian basketball player
 Umberto Zanotti Bianco (1889-1963), Italian archaeologist, environmentalist and lifetime senator

Italian-language surnames
Patronymic surnames
Surnames from given names